Paradise for Two is a lost 1927 American silent romantic comedy film produced by Famous Players-Lasky and distributed by Paramount Pictures. It was directed by Gregory La Cava and starred Richard Dix and Betty Bronson. Bronson had starred in a similarly titled film over at First National Pictures the previous year called Paradise.

Cast
Richard Dix as Steve Porter
Betty Bronson as Sally Lane
Edmund Breese as Uncle Howard
George Beranger as Maurice
Dorothy Appleby as young girl (uncredited)

See also
Cruise of the Jasper B, an existing similar themed film about inheritance

References

External links

Lobby poster(Wayback)

1927 films
American silent feature films
Lost American films
Films directed by Gregory La Cava
Films based on short fiction
Paramount Pictures films
1927 romantic comedy films
American romantic comedy films
American black-and-white films
Lost romantic comedy films
1927 lost films
1920s American films
Silent romantic comedy films
Silent American comedy films